Kim Sung-soo (born May 23, 1973) is a South Korean actor and television host. After beginning his career as a fashion model, Kim made his acting debut in the tokusatsu series Vectorman and the erotic film The Sweet Sex and Love. He has since appeared in the movies The Red Shoes and R2B: Return to Base, and several television series, including Full House, My Precious You, More Charming by the Day and My Lover, Madame Butterfly. In 2009 he made his stage debut in the play Mom, Do You Want to Go on a Trip?

More recently, Kim has expanded his career to variety shows. He was a regular on the popular reality show Invincible Baseball Team, and was the host of talk show Win Win in 2010. He also hosted several programs on cable, including fashion program Homme, bowling show Lucky Strike 300 and food show Noodle Myeongga.

Filmography

Film 
 Hero Vectorman: Counterattack of the Evil Empire (1999)
 The Sweet Sex and Love (2003)
 The Red Shoes (2005)
 Monopoly (2006)
 Hellcats (2008)
 California High Noon (short film, 2010)
 R2B: Return to Base (2012)
 Fasten Your Seatbelt (2013) - cameo
 The Black Hand (2015)

Television series 
 Vectorman: Warriors of the Earth 2 (KBS2, 1999)
 Say You Love Me (MBC, 2004)
 Full House (KBS2, 2004)
 Stained Glass (SBS, 2004)
 Lawyers (MBC, 2005)
 My Beloved Sister (MBC, 2006)
 Cruel Love (KBS2, 2007)
 My Precious You (KBS2, 2008)
 More Charming by the Day (MBC, 2010)
 The Slave Hunters (KBS2, 2010) - cameo
 Suspicious Family (MBN, 2012)
 My Lover, Madame Butterfly (SBS, 2012)
 After School: Lucky or Not (Nate/BTV/T-store/Hoppin, 2013) - cameo (ep 3)
 Can We Fall in Love, Again? (jTBC, 2014)
 Should We Kiss First (SBS, 2018)
 The Road: Tragedy of One (tvN, 2021)

Variety show 
Star N the City: Kim Sung-soo in London (XTM, 2009)
Invincible Saturday: Invincible Baseball Team (KBS2, 2009)
Homme 1.0 (XTM, 2009) - MC
Win Win (KBS2, 2010) - MC
Homme 2.0 (XTM, 2010) - MC
Lucky Strike 300 (XTM, 2010) - MC
Saturday Night Live Korea (tvN, 2012-01-14) - Host, episode 7
Noodle Myeongga (Olive TV, 2012) - MC
MasterChef Korea Celebrity (Olive TV, 2013)
Law of the Jungle in Caribbean/Maya Jungle (SBS, 2013)
Law of the City in New York (SBS, 2014)
  Star Golf Big League (tvN D ,Cast Member , 2021)

Music video 
"Never Ending Story" (Boohwal, 2002)
"추억은 시간이 지운다" (Youme, 2005)

Theater 
Mom, Do You Want to Go on a Trip? (2009)

Discography 
As Time Goes By (single, 2011)

Awards 
2004 SBS Drama Awards: New Star Award (Stained Glass)
2007 Korean Model Awards: Model Star Award, Fashion model category
2008 Jewelry Awards: Ruby Award
2009 Style Icon Awards: Male Cyon New Chocolate Fashionista
2010 MBC Entertainment Awards: Top Excellence Award, Actor in a Sitcom/Comedy (More Charming by the Day)
2013 SBS Entertainment Awards: Popularity Award (Law of the Jungle in Caribbean/Maya Jungle)

References

External links 
 
 
 
 

South Korean male television actors
South Korean male film actors
South Korean male models
IHQ (company) artists
1973 births
Living people